Maximiliano Tomás Centurión (born 20 February 1999) is an Argentine footballer currently playing as a centre-back for Defensores de Belgrano.

Career statistics

Club

Notes

References

1999 births
Living people
Argentine footballers
Argentine expatriate footballers
Argentina youth international footballers
Association football defenders
Sportspeople from Buenos Aires Province
Argentine Primera División players
Uruguayan Primera División players
Primera Nacional players
Argentinos Juniors footballers
Sud América players
Defensores de Belgrano footballers
Argentine expatriate sportspeople in Uruguay
Expatriate footballers in Uruguay
Argentina under-20 international footballers